Shermantown was a late 19th-century African-American shantytown in Stone Mountain Village neighborhood of Stone Mountain in Dekalb County, Georgia. It was named after General Sherman whose troops occupied Atlanta after the Civil War. It sits in the shadow of Stone Mountain Park.

African-American history in Atlanta
Former shantytowns and slums in Atlanta